RC Jiki Gori is a Georgian semi-professional rugby club from Gori, who plays in the Didi 10, the top division of Georgian rugby.

Current squad 
2020/2021 squad

Notable players
   Tornike Jalaghonia

External links
Jiki Gori

Rugby union teams from Georgia (country)
Rugby clubs established in 2001